St Cuthbert's Church, Doveridge is a Grade I listed parish church in the Church of England in Doveridge, Derbyshire.

History

The church dates from the late 12th century. It comprises a west steeple, a clerestoreyed nave with aisles and chancel. It was restored in 1840 and again in 1869.

Parish status
The church is in a joint parish with 
St John's Church, Alkmonton
St Andrew's Church, Cubley
St Giles’ Church, Marston Montgomery
St Paul's Church, Scropton
St Peter's Church, Somersal Herbert
All Saints’ Church, Sudbury

Memorials
Katherine Wall (d. 1713)
Ralph Okeover (d. 1487)
William Davenport (d. 1640)
Arabella Cavendish (d. 1739)
Francis Cavendish (d. 1650)
Rev. John Fitzherbert (d. 1785)
Rev. Thomas Cavendish (d. 1850) by C Maile Sc of London
Thomas Milward (d. 1658)

Organ

The pipe organ was built by Steele and Keay and dates from 1867. A specification of the organ can be found on the National Pipe Organ Register.

See also
Grade I listed churches in Derbyshire
Grade I listed buildings in Derbyshire
Listed buildings in Doveridge

References

Church of England church buildings in Derbyshire
Grade I listed churches in Derbyshire